Hugues de Roussan (born March 23, 1955) is a former Canadian handball player who competed in the 1976 Summer Olympics.

Born in Montreal, Quebec, he was part of the Canadian handball team which finished eleventh in the 1976 Olympic tournament. He played all five matches and scored eleven goals.

References
 profile

1955 births
Living people
Canadian male handball players
Olympic handball players of Canada
Handball players at the 1976 Summer Olympics
Sportspeople from Montreal
French Quebecers